The Nauruan or Nauru language is an Austronesian language, spoken natively in the island country of Nauru. Its relationship to the other Micronesian languages is not well understood.

Phonology

Consonants
Nauruan has 16–17 consonant phonemes.  Nauruan makes phonemic contrasts between velarized and palatalized labial consonants.  Velarization is not apparent before long back vowels and palatalization is not apparent before non-low front vowels.

Voiceless stops are geminated and nasals also contrast in length. Dental stops  and  become  and  respectively before high front vowels.

Depending on stress,  may be a flap or a trill.

Between a vowel and word-final , an epenthetic  appears.

Vowels
There are 12 phonemic vowels (six long, six short).

Non-open vowels (that is, all but ) become non-syllabic when preceding another vowel, as in  →  ('hide').

Stress

Stress is on the penultimate syllable when the final syllable ends in a vowel, on the last syllable when it ends in a consonant, and initial with reduplications.

Writing system 
In the Nauruan written language, 17 letters were originally used:
 The five vowels: a, e, i, o, u
 Twelve consonants: b, d, g, j, k, m, n, p, q, r, t, w

The letters c, f, h, l, s, v, x, y and z were not included. With the growing influence of foreign languages (most of all German, English and Gilbertese and some minority of Pama-Nyungan) more letters were incorporated into the Nauruan alphabet.  In addition, phonetic differences of a few vowels arose, so that umlauts and other similar-sounding sounds were indicated with a tilde.

Attempt at language reform of 1938 
In 1938 there was an attempt by the Nauruan language committee and Timothy Detudamo to make the language easier to read for Europeans and Americans. It was intended to introduce as many diacritical symbols as possible for the different vowel sounds to state the variety of the Nauruan language in writing. It was decided to introduce only a grave accent in the place of the former tilde, so that the umlauts "õ" and "ũ" were replaced by "ô" and "û". The "ã" was substituted with "e".

Also, "y" was introduced in order to differentiate words with the English "j". In addition, "ñ" (which represented the velar nasal) was replaced with "ng", to differentiate the Spanish Ñ, "bu" and "qu" were replaced with "bw" and "kw" respectively, "ts" was replaced with "j" (since it represented a pronunciation similar to English "j"), and the "w" written at the end of words was removed.

These reforms were only partly carried out: the umlauts "õ" and "ũ" are still written with tildes. However, the letters "ã" and "ñ" are now only seldom used, being replaced with "e" and "ng", as prescribed by the reform. Likewise, the writing of the double consonants "bw" and "kw" has been implemented. Although the "j" took the place of "ts", certain spellings still use "ts." For example, the districts Baiti and Ijuw (according to the reform  and ) are still written with the old writing style. The "y" has largely become generally accepted.

Today the following 30 Latin letters are used.
 Vowels: a, ã, e, i, o, õ, u, ũ
 Consonants: b, c, d, f, g, h, j, k, l, m, n, ñ, p, q, r, s, t, v, w, x, y, z

The relationship of the above letters and phonemes is: a[ɑ/a], ã[ɛ], e[e/e̞/ɛ], i[i/ɪ/ɨ], o[o/ɔ], õ[ø], u[ʊ/ʉ], ũ[y], b[b], bw[b͡w], c[k/s], d[d], di[ʤi], f[f], g[g], gw[g͡w], h[h], j[ʤ̊], k[k], kw[k͡w], nng[ŋː], l[l], m[m], n[n], ñ[ŋ], p[p], qu[k͡w], r[ɾ/r], s[s], t[t], ti[ʧi], ts[ʤ̊], v[f/v], w[w/ɣ], x[k͡s], y[j/ʝ], z[z].

Dialects 
According to a report published in 1937 in Sydney, there was a diversity of dialects until Nauru became a colony of Germany in 1888, and until the introduction of publication of the first texts written in Nauruan.  The varieties were largely so different that people of various districts often had problems understanding each other completely.  With the increasing influence of foreign languages and the increase of Nauruan texts, the dialects blended into a standardized language, which was promoted through dictionaries and translations by Alois Kayser and Philip Delaporte.

Today there is significantly less dialectal variation.  In the district of Yaren and the surrounding area there is an eponymous dialect spoken, which is only slightly different.

Delaporte's Nauruan dictionary
In 1907, Philip Delaporte published his pocket German-Nauruan dictionary.  The dictionary is small (10.5 × 14 cm), with 65 pages devoted to the glossary and an additional dozen to phrases, arranged alphabetically by the German. Approximately 1650 German words are glossed in Nauruan, often by phrases or synonymous forms. There are some 1300 'unique' Nauruan forms in the glosses, including all those occurring in phrases, ignoring diacritical marks. The accents used there are not common; just one accent (the tilde) is in use today.

Sample text 
The following example of text is from the Bible (Genesis, 1.1–1.8):

1 2 3 4 5 6 7 8

This text demonstrates a few of the German loanwords (e.g.

Phrases

References

Bibliography

"Nauru Grammar", by Alois Kayser compiled (1936); distributed by the German embassy 1993,

Further reading

External links

 
Languages of Nauru
Micronesian languages
Severely endangered languages